The Ombrina Mare oil field is an oil field located off shore Abruzzo. It was discovered in 2007 and developed by Mediterranean Oil & Gas. At the moment being the Italian government blocked the projects in the area, since the oil field lies at less than 12 miles from the coastline.

At least one of the companies that had discovered the oil and had concessions to extract it have taken the government of Italy to international arbitration court.

References

Oil fields in Italy